St Lawrence’s Church, Eyam is a Grade II* listed parish church in the Church of England in Eyam, Derbyshire.

History

The church is medieval with elements from the 13th and 15th centuries. It was partially rebuilt in 1619. The church was restored in 1868–70 by George Edmund Street with the work started by Malland and Son of Bamford at a cost of £1,337 for rebuilding the chancel and installing a new window. However, the work was much more involved than first estimated, as the chancel work uncovered the poor condition of the rest of the church and an additional £1,200 was needed. The contractor was changed to Dennett and Co of Nottingham, and the north aisle was rebuilt with five windows, and an additional aisle was added to the north side of the chancel. The galleries were removed, and the roof was re-leaded.

The south aisle and porch were rebuilt between 1882 and 1883 by Walker of Sheffield with the contractor being Hibbert of Baslow.

For a fuller account of this very active church and its many activities please go to https://www.eyamchurch.org/village-history/parish-church/.

Parish status

The church is in a joint parish with:
St Anne’s Church, Baslow
St Hugh’s Church, Foolow

Organ

The church contains a pipe organ by Brindley and Foster dating from 1879. A specification of the organ can be found on the National Pipe Organ Register.

See also
Grade II* listed buildings in Derbyshire Dales
Listed buildings in Eyam

References

Church of England church buildings in Derbyshire
Grade II* listed churches in Derbyshire
13th-century church buildings in England
15th-century church buildings in England